Wrestling at the 2020 Summer Olympics in Tokyo featured two disciplines, freestyle and Greco-Roman, which were further divided into different weight categories. Men competed in both disciplines whereas women only participated in the freestyle events, with 18 gold medals awarded. Wrestling had been contested at every modern Summer Olympic Games, except Paris 1900.

Around 288 wrestlers were expected to compete in 18 events at the 2020 Summer Olympics which was postponed in March 2020 and planned for 2021 as a result of the COVID-19 pandemic.

Competition format
16 wrestlers compete in each division. The competition consists of a single-elimination tournament, with a repechage used to determine the winner of two bronze medals. The two finalists face off for gold and silver medals. Each wrestler who loses to one of the two finalists moves into the repechage, culminating in a pair of bronze medal matches featuring the semifinal losers each facing the remaining repechage opponent from their half of the bracket.

Competition schedule

Qualification

Medalists

Men's freestyle

Men's Greco-Roman

Women's freestyle

Medal table

Participating nations
There are 61 participating nations:

See also
Wrestling at the 2018 Asian Games
Wrestling at the 2018 Summer Youth Olympics
Wrestling at the 2019 European Games
Wrestling at the 2019 Pan American Games
Wrestling at the 2019 African Games

References

External links
Results book 

 
2020
2020 Summer Olympics events
2021 in sport wrestling